The Bull Rock Lighthouse, is an active aid to navigation located 4km off Dursey Island, Ireland.

History
The lighthouse is the second one constructed  in this location. The first was built in 1866 on nearby Calf Rock. That lighthouse was cast iron but was destroyed by an Atlantic storm. The second was built on Bull Rock in 1889.

The first light house was built as a result of a request to establish a light on Bull Rock. However the commissioners chose Calf Rock. George Halpin designed the iron structure which was constructed by Henry Grissell of Regent's Canal Iron Works in London in 1861. The tower was completed in August 1864. The lantern and machinery were added and the light was turned on 30 June 1866. In 1870 additional strengthening was added to the structure. However on 27 November 1881 the lighthouse was destroyed when the tower snapped in a severe storm. The lighthouse keepers were not in the tower when it shattered but they were trapped on the Rock for two weeks before rescue was possible.

A temporary light from a ship was put into place at the west end of Dursey Island. It went into operation on 2 February 1882. After the destruction of the tower beyond the ability to be repaired the commissioners had to build the replacement on Bull Rock.

Current lighthouse
The new structure was an octagonal lighthouse tower. There were also buildings for the Keepers to live in. The building was completed in 1888 and on 1 January 1889 the light was turned on. There have been a number of changes to the original set up since. The fog warning was replaced with a siren on 1 April 1902 and discontinued on 17 May 1989. The energy source was upgraded to vapourised paraffin on 28 June 1910 and to electric power on 21 August 1974. The light was converted to automatic and the keepers removed from the Rock on 31 March 1991. The light converted to solar power on 6 October 2000.

See also

 List of lighthouses in Ireland

References

Lighthouses in Ireland
Lighthouses completed in 1888
1888 establishments in Ireland